Giá Rai is a district-level town or simply town (thị xã) of Bạc Liêu province in the Mekong Delta region of Vietnam. As of 2003 the town had a population of 125,690. The district covers an area of 348 km². The district capital lies at Giá Rai.

Administrative divisions
The town is divided into 3 wards: Ward 1 (formerly Giá Rai commune-level town), Hộ Phòng, Láng Tròn (formerly Phong Thạnh Đông A commune),  and 7 communes: Phong Thạnh, Phong Thạnh Đông, Phong Tân, Tân Phong, Phong Thạnh, Phong Thạnh Tây and Tân Thạnh.

References

Districts of Bạc Liêu province
County-level towns in Vietnam